Todd House or Todd Farm or Todd Farmhouse or variations may refer to:

Todd House (Plantersville, Alabama), listed on the NRHP in Alabama
Charles S. Todd House, Tucson, AZ, listed on the NRHP in Arizona
Orrin Todd House, Hamden, CT, listed on the NRHP in Connecticut
Todd House (Tabor, Iowa), listed on the NRHP in Iowa
Todd-Montgomery Houses, Danville, KY, listed on the NRHP in Kentucky
Robert Todd Summer Home, Frankfort, KY, listed on the NRHP in Kentucky 
Mary Todd Lincoln House, Lexington, KY, listed on the NRHP in Kentucky
William Lytle Todd House, Lexington, KY, listed on the NRHP in Kentucky
Porter–Todd House, Louisville, KY, listed on the NRHP in Kentucky
Charles and Letitia Shelby Todd House, Shelbyville, KY, listed on the NRHP in Kentucky 
Dr. John W. Todd House, Homer, LA, listed on the NRHP in Louisiana
Todd House (Eastport, Maine), listed on the NRHP in Maine
Todd Farmhouse (Fort Howard, Maryland), listed on the NRHP in Maryland
Edwin Todd House, Owosso, MI, listed on the NRHP in Michigan
MacDonald–Todd House, Hastings, MN, listed on the NRHP in Minnesota
Hiram Charles Todd House, Saratoga Springs, NY, listed on the NRHP in New York 
John Todd House, Hummelstown, PA, listed on the NRHP in Pennsylvania
Dolley Todd House, Walnut Street, Philadelphia, Pennsylvania, home of Dolley Todd Madison
Todd Farm (North Smithfield, Rhode Island), listed on the NRHP in Rhode Island 
Irby-Henderson-Todd House, Laurens, South Carolina, listed on the NRHP in South Carolina
Gibson-Todd House, Charles Town, West Virginia, listed on the NRHP in West Virginia